Bakesdown is a hamlet in northeast Cornwall, England, United Kingdom at .

Bakesdown is 5 miles (8 kilometres) southeast of Bude in the civil parish of Week St Mary.

References

Hamlets in Cornwall